José Luis Torres may refer to:

 José Luis Torres (footballer, born 1994), Uruguayan midfielder
 José Luis Torres (footballer, born 1995), Argentine forward